The 2018 election for Lieutenant Governor of Idaho took place on May 15, 2018. The primary election selected the candidates from each party to run in the November 6, 2018 general election for lieutenant governor of Idaho. Lieutenant governors serve a four-year term or terms. In 2018, the incumbent lieutenant governor, Brad Little, won the Republican nomination for governor and declined to run for re-election in order to run for governor.

Democratic primary candidates
 Kristin Collum of Boise, Idaho
 Jim Fabe of Ketchum, Idaho

Results
Kristin Collum received 52,417 votes and 88.2% of the votes and Jim Fabe received 6,987 votes and 11.8% of the votes.

Republican primary candidates
 Marv Hagedorn of Meridian, Idaho
 Janice McGeachin of Idaho Falls, Idaho
 Bob Nonini of Coeur d'Alene, Idaho
 Kelley Packer of McCammon, Idaho
 Stephen J. Yates of Boise, Idaho

Withdrawn candidates
 Rebecca W. Arnold of Boise, Idaho

Results
Janice McGeachin received a plurality of the votes in this primary garnering 51,098 votes and 28.9% of the votes. This was followed by Steve Yates with 48,269 votes and 27.3%, Marv Hargedorn with 26,653 votes and 15.1%, Bob Nonini with 26,556 votes and 15.0%, and Kelley Packer with 24,513 votes and 13.8%.

Voter eligibility 
Idaho's closed primary election allows only registered Republicans and unaffiliated voters the option of voting to select the next Republican candidate for lieutenant governor. Any registered or unregistered voter may vote in the Democratic primary to select the next lieutenant governor candidate from the two candidates running. Idaho has a same-day voter registration system which allows any voter to register to vote at a polling place on election day.

General Election 
Janice McGeachin was elected Idaho's 43rd Lieutenant Governor with 356,507 votes and 59.7% of the votes and Kristin Collum received 240,355 votes and 40.3% of the votes.

See also
Idaho gubernatorial election, 2018

References

Idaho-related lists
2018 Idaho elections